Tracy K. Smith (born April 16, 1972) is an American poet and educator. She served as the 22nd Poet Laureate of the United States from 2017 to 2019. She has published five collections of poetry, winning the Pulitzer Prize for her 2011 volume Life on Mars. Her memoir, Ordinary Light, was published in 2015.

In April 2018, she was nominated for a second term as United States Poet Laureate by Librarian of Congress Carla Hayden.

Early life
Born in Falmouth, Massachusetts, she was raised in Fairfield, California, in a family with "deep roots" in Alabama. Her mother was a teacher and her father an engineer who worked on the Hubble Space Telescope. Her book Life on Mars pays homage to her father's life and work.  Smith became interested in writing and poetry early, reading Emily Dickinson and Mark Twain in elementary school; Dickinson's poems, in particular, struck Smith as working like "magic," she wrote in her memoir Ordinary Light, with the rhyme and meter making Dickinson's verses feel almost impossible not to commit to memory. Smith then composed a short poem entitled "Humor" and showed it to her fifth-grade teacher, who encouraged her to keep writing. The work of Elizabeth Bishop, Seamus Heaney, Philip Larkin, Yusef Komunyakaa, and Rita Dove also became significant influences.

Smith received her A.B. from Harvard University, where she studied with Helen Vendler, Lucie Brock-Broido, Henri Cole and Seamus Heaney. While in Cambridge, Smith joined the Dark Room Collective. She graduated in 1994, then earned an M.F.A. in Creative Writing from Columbia University in 1997. From 1997 to 1999, she was a Stegner Fellow in poetry at Stanford University.

Career 

Smith has taught at Medgar Evers College of the City University of New York, the University of Pittsburgh and Columbia University. She taught summer sessions at Bread Loaf School of English at Middlebury College in 2011, 2012, and 2014 and was the 2014 Robert Frost Chair of Literature.

In 2006, she joined the faculty of Princeton University, where she was made a member of Phi Beta Kappa and the Roger S. Berlind '52 Professor in the Humanities. On July 1, 2019, she became Chair of Princeton's Lewis Center for the Arts.

Smith was a judge for the 2016 Griffin Poetry Prize.

From 2018 to 2020, Smith hosted the podcast and radio program The Slowdown.

In 2021, Smith joined the faculty of English and of African and African American Studies at Harvard University. She is the Susan S. and Kenneth L. Wallach Professor at Harvard Radcliffe Institute

Critical reception
In his review of Life on Mars, Troy Jollimore selects Smith's poem "My god, it's full of stars" as particularly strong, "making use of images from science and science fiction to articulate human desire and grief, as the speaker allows herself to imagine the universe:"
... sealed tight, so nothing escapes. Not even time,
Which should curl in on itself and loop around like smoke.
So that I might be sitting now beside my father
As he raises a lit match to the bowl of his pipe
For the first time in the winter of 1959.
In his review of the collection, Joel Brouwer also quoted at length from this poem, writing that "for Smith the abyss seems as much a space of possibility as of oblivion:"
Perhaps the great error is believing we’re alone,
That the others have come and gone — a momentary blip —
When all along, space might be choc-full of traffic,
Bursting at the seams with energy we neither feel
Nor see, flush against us, living, dying, deciding,
...
Dan Chiasson writes of another aspect of the collection: "The issues of power and paternalism suggest the deep ways in which this is a book about race. Smith’s deadpan title is itself racially freighted: we can’t think about one set of fifties images, of Martians and sci-fi comics, without conjuring another, of black kids in the segregated South. Those two image files are situated uncannily close to each other in the cultural cortex, but it took this book to connect them."

About The Body's Question, Lucie Brock-Broido writes: "How delightful it is to fall under the lucid and quite more than lovely spell of Tracy K. Smith's debut collection. Smith's work is deceptively plainspoken, but these are poems that are powerfully wrought, inspiring in all the clarity of their many gospel truths. The Body's Question announces a remarkable new voice, brilliantly bundled, ingeniously belted down."

Yusef Komunyakaa writes: "The Body's Question is an answer to pure passion, but the beauty is that the brain isn't divorced from the body. The strength of character in these marvelous poems delights and questions. Here's a voice that can weave beauty and terror into one breath, and the unguarded revelations are never verbal striptease."

"Tracy Smith speaks many different languages. Besides the Spanish that graces the 'Gospels' of her book's opening section, Smith also seems perfectly at home speaking of grief and loss, of lust and hunger, of joy and desire, which here often means the desire for desire, and a desire for language itself....She seems to speak in tongues, to speak about that thing even beyond language, answering 'The Body's Question' of her title," said Kevin Young.

About Smith's second book, Duende, Elizabeth Alexander writes: "Tracy K. Smith synthesizes the riches of many discursive and poetic traditions without regard to doctrine and with great technical rigor. Her poems are mysterious but utterly lucid and write a history that is sub-rosa yet fully within her vision. They are deeply satisfying and necessarily inconclusive. And they are pristinely beautiful without ever being precious. Writers and musicians have explored the concept of duende, which might in English translate to a kind of existential blues. Smith is not interested in sadness, per se. Rather, in the strange music of these poems I think Smith is trying to walk us close to the edge of death-in-life, the force of hovering death in both the personal and social realms, admitting its inevitability and sometimes-proximity, and understand its manifestations in quotidian acts. This dark force is nonetheless a life force, which, in the poem 'Flores Woman,' concludes 'Like a dark star. I want to last' If Duende were wine, it would certainly be red; if edible, it would be meat cooked rare, coffee taken black, stinky cheese, bittersweet chocolate. Tracy K. Smith's music is wholly her own, and Duende is a dolorous, beautiful book."

Smith has received praise throughout her books for her questions on relationships, identity and sexuality. Hilton Als of The New Yorker writes: "Part of the gorgeous struggle in Smith’s poetry is about how to understand and accept her twin selves: the black girl who was brought up to be a polite Christian and the woman who is willing to give herself over to unbridled sensation and desire."

Her book Ordinary Light: A Memoir, about race, faith and the dawning of her poetic vocation, was a finalist for the National Book Award for Nonfiction in 2015.

Smith is writing two operas, one about Jane Jacobs and Robert Moses and their competing visions for New York City (a project with composer Judd Greenstein and video artist Joshua Frankel) and the other, with composer Gregory Spears, about slavery's legacy.

Personal life 
Smith lives in Massachusetts with her husband, Raphael Allison, and their three children. The family previously lived in Boerum Hill, Brooklyn.

Bibliography

Poetry 
Collections
 
 
 
 
 

List of poems

Anthologies (as editor)
 American journal: fifty poems for our time. Graywolf Press. 2018. 

Anthologies (as contributor)
 Poems, Poets, Poetry
 Poets on Teaching: A Sourcebook
 State of the Union: 50 Political Poems
 When She Named Fire
 Efforts and Affection: Women Poets on Mentorship
 The McSweeney's Book of Poets Picking Poets
 Legitimate Dangers: American Poets of the New Century
 The Autumn House Anthology of Contemporary American Poetry
 Gathering Ground: A Reader Celebrating Cave Canem's First Decade
 Poetry Daily: 366 Poems from the World's Most Popular Poetry Website
 Poetry 30: Thirty-Something Thirty-Something American Poets
 
 

Translations

Non-fiction

Awards, grants, fellowships
Grant from the Ludwig Vogelstein Foundation.
Fellowship from the Bread Loaf Writers' Conference.
Rona Jaffe Foundation Writers' Award.
Cave Canem Prize (2002) for The Body's Question. This award honors the best first book by an African-American poet; Smith's book was chosen by Kevin Young.
Whiting Award in 2005 for poetry. This award is for emerging writers.
James Laughlin Award in 2006 for Duende. This award from the Academy of American Poets honors the best second volume of a poet published in the US.
Essence magazine's Literary Award in 2008 for Duende. The award honors the best African-American literature.
Rolex Mentor and Protégé Arts Initiative in 2010. Hans Magnus Enzensberger became Smith's mentor for one year as part of this program; their experience worked together was described in a short article by Philip Dodd.
Pulitzer Prize for Poetry in 2012 for Life on Mars (Graywolf Press), "a collection of bold, skillful poems, taking readers into the universe and moving them to an authentic mix of joy and pain."
Academy Fellowship in 2014 given by the Academy of American Poets to recognize distinguished poetic achievement.
2015 National Book Award for Nonfiction shortlist for Ordinary Light
2016 Robert Creeley Award 
2018 American Ingenuity Award for Education 
2022 Golden Plate Award of the American Academy of Achievement

References

Further reading

 Starred review of Smith's second collection.

External links

Official author website
Profile at The Whiting Foundation
Tracy K. Smith profile at Poets.org—biography, related essays, poems, and interviews from the Academy of American Poets
2018 commencement speech, Wellesley College
Stuart A. Rose Manuscript, Archives, and Rare Book Library, Emory University: Tracy K. Smith papers, 1972-2018

Online poetry
 Short biography and links to audio recordings of Smith reading her poetry and responding to audience questions.

"My God, It's Full of Stars". 
 Links to several of Smith's poems.

Bibliography
 

 

1972 births
African-American poets
American women poets
Columbia University School of the Arts alumni
Harvard University alumni
Stanford University people
People from Falmouth, Massachusetts
Poets from Massachusetts
Princeton University faculty
Pulitzer Prize for Poetry winners
Living people
Rona Jaffe Foundation Writers' Award winners
Stegner Fellows
The New Yorker people
American Poets Laureate
21st-century American poets
People from Boerum Hill, Brooklyn
American opera librettists
Women opera librettists
American women academics
21st-century American women writers
21st-century African-American women writers
21st-century African-American writers
20th-century African-American people
20th-century African-American women